Nico Frommer (born 8 April 1978 in Ulm, West Germany) is a German former professional footballer who played as a striker.

References

External links
 
 Chat protocol Nico Frommer 

1978 births
Living people
German footballers
Association football forwards
Germany under-21 international footballers
Germany B international footballers
VfB Stuttgart players
VfB Stuttgart II players
SSV Reutlingen 05 players
Borussia Mönchengladbach players
Eintracht Frankfurt players
Bundesliga players
2. Bundesliga players
3. Liga players
Rot-Weiß Oberhausen players
VfL Osnabrück players
RB Leipzig players
1. FC Heidenheim players
Sportspeople from Ulm
Footballers from Baden-Württemberg